Jameh Shuran-e Sofla (also Romanized as Jāmeh Shūrān-e Soflá; also known as Jāmeh Shūrān and Jāmeh Shūrān-e Pā’īn) is a village in Mahidasht Rural District, Mahidasht District, Kermanshah County, Kermanshah Province, Iran. At the 2006 census, its population was 375, in 97 families.

References 

Populated places in Kermanshah County